WGLB (1560 AM) is a gospel music radio station licensed to Elm Grove, Wisconsin and serving the Milwaukee metropolitan area. The station is owned and licensed to JJK Media, LLC, which is co-owned by the children of founding owner Joel Kinlow. In addition to WGLB, Kinlow used to own television station WJJA in Racine and FM radio station WGLB-FM in Port Washington, Wisconsin (Kinlow died on June 7, 2016). On April 20, 2015, WGLB was granted a Federal Communications Commission construction permit to increase day power to 2,500 watts and add critical hours service with 700 watts.

Licensed to Port Washington, Wisconsin, WGLB signed on the air in 1963, broadcasting with 250 watts daytime only. An FM sister station, WGLB-FM, was launched in 1969. In 2003, the FM station was sold to Starboard Broadcasting and switched its format to religious programming.

In August 2001, WGLB's city of license was changed to the Milwaukee suburb of Elm Grove, and the current transmitter site went into operation. The station also obtained authorization to begin nighttime broadcasting.

References

External links
 

GLB
Gospel radio stations in the United States